Beniamino Vignola (born 12 June 1959 in Verona)  is an Italian former footballer and entrepreneur, who played as a midfielder. He notably played for Juventus and was part of their European Cup victory in 1985. A small, quick, mobile, agile, and creative player, with excellent technical ability and a slender physique, he usually played as a central or attacking midfielder; considered a promising talent, he was compared to Gianni Rivera as a youngster.

Club career
Vignola began his career with Hellas Verona, making his Serie A debut in 1978. In 1980, he moved to Avellino, where he remained for three seasons, wearing the number 10 shirt.

He was notably acquired by Juventus in 1983 for 4.8 billion Lire, as a back-up to Michel Platini, remaining at the club until 1988. Despite initially featuring mainly as a substitute, he later became a member of the starting line-up, and he helped Juventus to win the Serie A title and the European Cup Winners' Cup during the 1983–84 season. He scored two goals against Udinese that season and also scored and set-up Boniek's match-winning goal in the 1984 European Cup Winners' Cup Final, as Juventus beat Porto 2–1 in Basel. The following season, he won the 1984 European Super Cup with Juventus, and he was part of their European Cup victory in 1985.

In 1988, he moved to Empoli in Serie B, where he was unable to prevent the club from being relegated to Serie C1 during the 1988–89 season. He ended his career in 1992, playing in Serie C2 with Mantova. He would later become the team's sporting director during the 1993–94 season. After the team went bankrupt, he became a player-manager with an amateur side in Verona called San Martino Buon Albergo, and he soon retired from football.

International career
Vignola represented the Italy under-21 side on 5 occasions, scoring 2 goals. He played for the Italy at the 1984 Summer Olympics in Los Angeles, where the Italians reached the semi-finals, finishing the tournament in fourth place. He never appeared for the Italian senior side.

Honours
Juventus
Serie A: 1983–84
European Cup: 1984–85
European Cup Winners' Cup: 1983–84
European Super Cup: 1984

References

1959 births
Living people
Footballers from Verona
Italian footballers
Footballers at the 1984 Summer Olympics
Olympic footballers of Italy
Italy under-21 international footballers
Serie A players
Serie B players
Serie C players
Hellas Verona F.C. players
Juventus F.C. players
Empoli F.C. players
Mantova 1911 players
U.S. Avellino 1912 players
Association football midfielders